Sylvia Bravo Larsen is a New Hampshire politician who was a Democratic member of the New Hampshire Senate and its longest serving Democratic female leader. She represented New Hampshire's 15th State Senate District for 20 years, from 1994 through 2014. Larsen served as Senate President from 2006 to 2010. Between 2008 and 2010, Larsen led the nation's first female majority legislative body.

Early life and education 
Larsen earned a bachelor's degree from the University of Wisconsin, Madison in 1972.

Career 
Larsen served ten terms representing District 15 which includes the state's capital city of Concord, along with Henniker, Hopkinton and Warner. Prior to retiring in 2014, she was the Vice Chair of the Capital Budget Committee and a long-term member of the Senate Finance and Joint Fiscal Committees.

Larsen was Senate Democratic Leader for over a decade, becoming Senate President Pro Tempore and later was New Hampshire's longest serving female Senate President from 2006 to 2010. For two of those years, 2008 to 2010, she led the nation's first legislative body to include a majority of women with 13 female senators elected to the 24 member body.

In the course of her 20 years in the Senate, Larsen was the prime sponsor of a first-in-the-nation tax-free college tuition savings plan, the $10 billion Unique Plan. She sponsored laws establishing the Land and Community Heritage Investment Program (LCHIP), Healthy Kids and workforce housing opportunities. Throughout her career, she co-sponsored legislation to raise the high school dropout age, to create the multi-state Regional Greenhouse Gas Initiative, to establish a research and development tax credit for businesses, to establish a state code of ethics, and to reinstate the state's job training fund, including a Pathway to Work program for unemployed persons establishing self-employment. Through bipartisan leadership, Larsen guided the passage of the New Hampshire Health Protection Program which recently expanded  affordable health insurance to 48,000 working New Hampshire residents.  
     
Larsen served as the Senate's representative to the New Hampshire Children's Trust Fund and the Healthy Kids Corporation for 10 years. In addition, she was chairwoman of the New Hampshire College Tuition Savings Plan Commission, a member of the Land and Community Heritage Commission, and a member of the Christa McAuliffe Planetarium Commission. She also served on the New Hampshire Workforce Opportunity Council and the New Hampshire Youth Council. 
     
In 2007, Larsen was named Outstanding Legislator of the Year by the New Hampshire Association of Counties. In 2008, she was one of three senators recognized as Legislators of the Year by the Home Builders and Remodelers Association of New Hampshire. She also received the New Hampshire Award to End Homelessness in 2008. Her successful efforts to establish the Unique college savings program led the New Hampshire College & University Council to recognize her with a New Hampshire Higher Education Partnership Award in 2007. She was also named Democratic Legislator of the Year in 2007 by the New Hampshire Social Workers Association. Other honors include the Woman of Achievement Award by the Business and Professional Women's Association of Concord, the Dunfey-Kanteres Award for exemplary service to the people of New Hampshire, and the 2007 Woman of Distinction Award for New Hampshire Remarkable Women. 
     
Larsen served the City of Concord as a councilor-at-large from 1989 to 1998. In that capacity, she was a member of the Economic Development, Solid Waste, and Fiscal Goals committees, and was chairwoman of the Community Development Advisory Committee. 
     
In addition to her responsibilities in the Senate, Larsen was co-chairwoman of the Capitol Center for the Arts capital campaign drive and the Concord Boys and Girls Club Teen Center drive. She served on the Concord Regional Development Corporation, and is an incorporator of the Merrimack County Savings Bank. Larsen is past-chair of the Families in Transition-Concord Advisory Board. Past participation on boards also include service as a trustee of Concord Hospital and as president of Bancroft Products Inc. She currently serves on the board of the Circle Program for at-risk girls, the New Hampshire Charitable Fund Regional board, and as an incorporator at Canterbury Shaker Village. 
     
A graduate of the University of Wisconsin in Madison, Larsen worked for seven years in the Wisconsin State Senate. In New Hampshire, she served as the legislative liaison for Governor Hugh Gallen. Past professional experience includes positions with the New Hampshire Historical Society, the New Hampshire Disability Council, and the New Hampshire Council on World Affairs. 
     
Larsen and her husband, Robert, live in Concord. They have two adult children.

In 2014, Larsen announced that she would not seek re-election.

References

External links
Profile at the New Hampshire Senate Democratic Caucus
 

Democratic Party New Hampshire state senators
1949 births
Living people
Women state legislators in New Hampshire
People from Troy, Ohio
Presidents of the New Hampshire Senate
20th-century American politicians
20th-century American women politicians
21st-century American politicians
21st-century American women politicians
University of Wisconsin–Madison alumni